Daniel Christian Hallingström (born 10 February 1981) is a former Swedish footballer and manager. He spent the most of his career at Åtvidabergs FF.

References

External links
 
  
 

1981 births
Living people
Association football defenders
Åtvidabergs FF players
Kalmar FF players
Åtvidabergs FF managers
Allsvenskan players
Superettan players
Swedish footballers
Swedish football managers